The Number of Identified Specimens or Number of Individual Specimens (NISP) is defined as the number of identified specimens for a specific site or skeleton. And a good NISP is a very desirable goal. The number of individual specimens is the most important factor in calculating a NISP. When it comes to this project, there are three types of identification involved in this project. It is from the remains of humans, animals, and plants. In this regard, a lot of work has been carried out in the United States and Germany by the National Academy of Sciences to produce a standard classification. Some believe that the NISP is just a basic classification of a site or skeleton and there are many ways to calculate it. NISP is a basic technique that is widely used for estimating the relative abundance of specimens in a collection

Discussing cutting is a common practice in cutting-edge archaeology. However, there may currently be no consensus on a first-class way to quantify them due to many problems at the archaeology sites. However, archeologists can compute experimental methods to evaluate manipulative streak patterns with ten very fragmented simulated forelimbs and hindlimbs, with reduced use of NISP due to quantification units and footprint.

In addition, the frequencies of the ordinal scale of the anatomical parts of the crest (proximal, marginal, distal) are not constant and fluctuate in simulators. The paleontological analytical results show the significant differences between the two quantitative methods.

An alternative estimate to NISP, often done in concert, is minimum number of individuals (MNI).  Both are influenced by fragmentation and limited preservation, but in different ways.  NISP tends to overestimate the number of individuals under moderate fragmentation, but the overestimate lessens as fragmentation increases due to the inability to classify the bones.  MNI tends to underestimate the actual number under medium fragmentation, and even more severely when bones are highly fragmented.  Under hypothetically perfect preservation and no fragmentation, these estimates should be the same. MNI also suffers from the aggregation problem, in which different aggregations will generate at least two values, a MNI minimum and maximum, which are generally empirically indistinguishable. Both NISP and MNI are likely only ordinals scale measurements, which means at best they can only give an ordered series of taxonomic abundance, i.e. "Taxon A is more numerous than Taxon B."

NISP should not be used when calculating a sample size for inferential statistics, because it will inflate the statistical significance. Thus in these situations MNI should be used instead.

Modern uses

Cut-mark analyses 

The archaeological sites give vital information concerning the massacre, and the examination of the traces provides that knowledge. Colored bands have been used to study anything from the evolutionary impacts of meat-eating in Africa (e.g. Bunn, 1981, 1983; Shipman and Rose, 1983) to culturally mediated slaughter patterns in the United States. to the north (e.g. Frison, 1970; Guilday et al., 1962). Abe et al. (2002), Dominguez Rodrigo and Iravedra (2009), Fischer (1995: 12–18), Lyman (1987; 1994b: 297–314), Nielssen (2000), and White (1992: 143–146) are examples of researchers from other nations.

The cut mark pattern is usually determined by observing the frequency and relative location of cuts on skeletal parts. These patterns are then related to butcher behavior, frequently utilizing ethnographic, factual, and/or empirical data as a frame of reference (e.g. Binford, 1978, 1981; Dewberry and Russell, 2007; Lupo and O'Connell, 2002). Although analysts' approaches for quantifying, assessing, and reporting landmarks vary depending on their study aims (see Abe et al., 2002:645-646; Bartram, 1993), differences in samples and conclusions owing to methodologies and units of quantification have not been experimentally investigated.

Cut-mark studies and two types of quantitative 
In general, most tracing studies use two types of quantification: one used to identify and explain the anatomical part of the group, and one used to determine the frequency of cutting the anatomical part described above. The unit is in use. The anatomical segment is usually determined by the specified number of specimens (NISP) or the minimum number of items (MNE). Similar to MNE, some researchers use cMNE.  When using MNE or cMNE as a quantitative unit, archaeologists usually refer to the complete skeletal component (eg, femur). You need to be clear about what you're doing. Unless some bone element is otherwise specified (eg, proximal femur, distal femur).

The NISP, on the other hand, is a unit of measurement associated with a particular sample that may or may not be a complete structural element but is identified as part and sometimes as a complete structural element. Screaming. In the case of lines, two quantitative units are widely used to measure them. This is the number of glass pieces and the number of samples to hold the glass panes, which was subsequently identified as the number of glass pieces. After calculating the number of cuts or cuts, the results were analyzed and reported as a percentage of the total NISP with observed cuts (%NISPcut) or as a percentage of the total MNC with observed cuts. Close to (%MNEcut). Although %NISPcut and %MNEcut are units of quantitative analysis commonly used in cut-off studies, their reliability has rarely been assessed in the context of bone segmentation.

Fragment-count 
The cutmark count is a count of how many individual cutmarks, or get-togethers of cutmarks in a given skeletal area (e.g., Abe et al., 2002:645; Lyman 1994b:303-304; Nilssen, 2000:40; White, 1992:146), while fragment-count is the level of the full-scale number of quantitative units (e.g., NISP or MNE) with saw cutmarks. Cutmark piece considers are, when in doubt, detailed %NISPcut, the level of the complete NISP showing cutmarks (NISPcut) (Abe et al., 2002:645; Lyman, 1994b:304-305; 2005). Abe et al. (2002) identified an ordinary issue with this technique. They showed that because of abnormality and bone-breaking down, %NISPcut possibly underrates the level of models with cutmarks.

This is generally the circumstance considering the way that cutmarks are inflicted on a skeletal part during butchery when defleshing and dis-articulating a creature. These cycles are commonly performed before breakage related to the extraction of inside bone improvements like marrow and oil. Abe et al. (2002) propose that if a skeletal part, say the femur, was defleshed and disarticulated, the level of cutmarks examples of the immovable number of models ought to be 1/1, thinking about the way that, for this current situation, the outright part is additionally a model (%NISPcut 100; Abe et al., 2002: Fig. 1a). Notwithstanding, after that equivalent part is dealt with for marrow and segregated, the level of cutmarks models can end up being more fundamental, speculatively, as Abe et al's. Fig. 1b portrays, 2/8 (articular fruitions despite screw regions; %NISPcut 25).

The fragmentation cycle causing this model is clear concerning cutmarks surface region identical to the whole surface region all through a total bone. However, on the off chance that totally covered by cutmarks, undeniably the surface region expected by cutmarks all through a skeletal part will be by and large insignificant contrasting with the excess, whole surface area. Fittingly, in the event that the bone brokenness process isn't specifically focusing on cutmarked surfaces, the imbalanced extent of cut and whole surface regions ought to persistently pass a further degree of whole portions onto cut parts, conclusively developing the essential relative capability between the two (1/1).

Considering that skeletal part surfaces are not totally covered by cutmarks, there ought to ordinarily be even more whole surface regions open to section. Anyway, notwithstanding how there is a reasonable potential for break cycles to cause a biasing influence, zooarchaeologists truly don't have even the remotest hint about the level of this impact on the units used to evaluate cutmarks, or, on the butchery surmisings found utilizing these units. The motivation driving this study is to assist shed with some lighting on the impacts of breaks on cut-mark assessments.

One answer for the break issue is the utilization of mechanical refitting as a curation system got together with the cMNE as a quantitative unit of assessment. All around, refitting plays had a principal sway in broadening the accuracy of skeletal element identification, quantification, and the derivation of standards of lead (e.g., Bunn, 1982:38-41; Marean and Kim, 1998; Rapson and Todd, 1992). The use of refitting has additionally been proposed for assessments of cortical surface modification while get-together fragmentation and thickness interceded reliable adversity is high (Abe et al., 2002; Bartram, 1993; Marean et al., 2004:93)

As its name proposes, the cMNE broadly addresses the base number of parts present in a model, by including all apportioned models after they are redone. In a general sense, the cMNE can be seen as a quantitative unit that endeavors to most enthusiastically address the primary skeletal part rehash present in a model. Precisely when models are genuinely revamped and quantified as cMNE, the impacts of brokenness on how much cut and whole skeletal parts will be traded by diminishing the degree of whole units to cutmarks units. Thusly the effect of brokenness ought to be less breaking point on changed units than on units not depending on refitting (e.g., NISP). In any case, contrasts between the two quantitative units, if any, have not been intentionally investigated or quantified likely, nor has the inferential effect of either unit been surveyed.

The effects of NISP on cut-mark analyses 
NISP can mislead the Cut-mark conclusions based on strips. Even though due to the fact that the differences between identical markers and elongated bones were large, differences between anatomical sites had the greatest impact on Butcher's conclusions. This has a potentially dangerous direct effect on the butcher's conclusions about size. Also, while a close correlation of two 1s on an ordinal scale can be seen as an indicator of a high degree of similarity, modern mathematical "machines'' are not equipped with computational methods, and differences in ranks may not be statistically significant. Deviations may change the interpretation of the massacre by archaeologists.

References

Lyman, Lee R. (2008) Quantitative Paleozoology. Cambridge: Cambridge UP.

Methods in archaeology